Askeaton Abbey or Askeaton Friary is a former Franciscan monastery located north of Askeaton, County Limerick, Ireland, on the east bank of the River Deel.

History

Askeaton Abbey was founded for the Order of Friars Minor Conventual by Gerald FitzGerald, 3rd Earl of Desmond between 1389 and 1400; or by James FitzGerald, 6th Earl of Desmond in 1420.

The abbey was reformed under the Order of Friars Minor in 1490; it was reformed again in 1513 and a provincial chapter held there in 1564.

Askeaton was plundered and later abandoned by Nicholas Malby's men in 1579 during the Second Desmond Rebellion, and some of the friars were killed. It was revived in 1627 and abandoned in 1648 when Cromwell’s forces neared. It was reestablished in 1658 and continued to house friars until 1714.

Remains

The church and its north transept, sacristy, cloister arcade and domestic buildings survive. Notable features include the cloister with its carvings of Francis of Assisi with stigmata, a Mass dial, sedilia, several Fitzgerald dynasty tombs, and a carving of Christ as the Man of Sorrows.

Gallery

References

Franciscan monasteries in the Republic of Ireland
Religion in County Limerick
Archaeological sites in County Limerick
National Monuments in County Limerick